Changjiang is a district of the city of Jingdezhen, Jiangxi, China.

Administrative divisions
Changjiang District is divided to 2 subdistricts, 2 towns and 3 townships.
2 Subdistricts
 Xijiao
 Xinfeng

2 Towns
 Jingcheng
 Nianyushan

3 Townships
 Liyang
 Hetang
 Lümeng

References

County-level divisions of Jiangxi